Colombia–Israel relations are the diplomatic relations between Colombia and  Israel which were officially established in the mid-1950s.

General 

In an article in the Israel Journal of Foreign Affairs, Marcos Peckel, a Colombian scholar noted that Colombian-Israeli relations can be looked through the lenses of military cooperation, trade links, education and culture, and recognition of Palestine. Militarily, Colombia was one of the first countries to give Israel weapons and engage in arms deals, which has since been an ongoing bilateral agreement. Since, Israel and Colombia have shared intelligence, and as Peckel explains, several pieces of Israeli technology. Trade-wise, too, both countries have a strong relationship. The Free Trade Agreement, a pending agreement between Colombia and Israel, has the potential to further strengthen these relationships by boosting Colombian imports in Israel and increasing the presence of Israeli technology in Colombia. The spheres of education and culture between Colombia and Israel are deeply interwoven through Israeli scholarships to Colombians and a presence of media in each country.

History 

In 1947, during a United Nations General Assembly session, General Assembly Resolution 181 recommended the partition of British Mandate Palestine into one Jewish and one Arab state. Colombia abstained.

In the mid-1950s both countries officially established diplomatic relations and set up embassies in Bogotá and Tel Aviv respectively. Relations improved tremendously in 1988 when major trade agreements were signed between Israel and Colombia. A Free Trade agreement was signed on 10 June 2013. However, it has not yet been ratified by Colombia and therefore is not yet in force. This agreement reduces tariffs on industrial and agricultural products between the two countries, and enable Israeli companies and individuals to invest with greater ease in the Colombia economy, considered to be second biggest economy of South America. Israeli exports to Colombia totaled some US$143 million in 2012, and consisted mostly of communications equipment, machinery, electrical and mechanical devices and chemical products.

Colombia also supports the aspiration of the Palestinian people to establish themselves as a free and independent state in the region. Additionally, Israel is Colombia's main partner in the region and is Colombia's second largest trading partner in South America after Brazil. Bilateral relations have deepened through high-level visits in recent history.

On 13 September 2017, Israeli Prime Minister Benjamin Netanyahu paid an official visit to Colombia.

Israeli President Isaac Herzog welcomed Colombian President Iván Duque on a state visit to Israel in November 2021. Hosting Duque at the President’s Residence in Jerusalem, Herzog commended Colombia’s support for Israel and expressed his hopes to boost their bilateral trading relationship. At the state dinner, Herzog paid tribute to Duque’s leadership in fighting “terror and rogue organizations affiliated with Iran and narco organizations.” During the state visit, Duque inaugurated a Colombian innovation office in Jerusalem, a step that President Herzog welcomed in their joint statements.

Technological cooperation 
Colombia has purchased planes, drones, weapons and intelligence systems from Israel.

Palestine  
Until 2018, Colombia was one of the few remaining governments in Latin America that did not recognize Palestine as a state. 

"Colombia supports the establishment of an independent Palestinian state alongside Israel within mutually agreed-upon borders. It considers Israeli settlements in the West Bank illegal but strongly condemns Palestinian terrorism, and it advocates for a lasting peace based on the two-state solution". On resolutions in the UN General Assembly that compared Zionism to racism and wanted to establish a "right to return" for Palestinians, Colombia abstained. In 2018, Colombia officially recognized the State of Palestine. Despite creating a bump in the relations between the countries, the two countries have re-established strong relations.

Resident diplomatic missions
 Colombia has an embassy in Tel Aviv.
 Israel has an embassy in Bogotá.

See also  
 Foreign relations of Colombia 
 Foreign relations of Israel
 History of the Jews in Colombia
 International recognition of Israel

References

External links 
 jewishvirtuallibrary.org The Virtual Jewish History Tour Colombia By Sarah Szymkowicz

 
Israel
Bilateral relations of Israel